The Mayo Clinic diet is a diet book first published in 1949 by the Mayo Clinic committee on dietetics as the Mayo Clinic diet manual. Prior to this, use of that term was generally connected to fad diets with no association to the clinic. The book is now published as The Mayo Clinic diet with a companion logbook, The Mayo Clinic diet journal.

The diet begins with a two-week period where five specific bad habits are replaced by five specific good habits. According to the authors this should result in a 6- to 10-pound (2.5- to 4.5 kg) loss during that 2-week period. The remainder of the program is based in large part on a combination of portion control and exercise/activity. This part of the program is designed to allow the safe loss of one to two pounds per week, or 50 to 100 pounds (22 to 45 kg) over the course of a year.

The program uses a food pyramid that has vegetables and fruits as its base. It puts carbohydrates, meat and dairy, fats, and sweets into progressively more limited daily allowances. The diet emphasizes setting realistic goals, replacing poor health habits with good ones, and conscious portion control.

Five bad habits
 Added sugar
 Snacks other than fruits and vegetables
 Overlarge servings of meat or dairy products
 Eating restaurant meals that don't follow the diet
 Watching television while eating

Diets falsely called "Mayo Diet"
The legitimate Mayo Clinic Diet does not promote a high protein or "key food" approach. There have been diets falsely attributed to Mayo Clinic for decades. Many or most web sites claiming to debunk the bogus version of the diet are actually promoting it or a similar fad diet. The Mayo Clinic website appears to no longer acknowledge the existence of the false versions and prefers to promote their own researched diet.

See also
Diet (nutrition)
Dieting
Digestion
List of diets

References

External links
 The Mayo Clinic Diet

Dieting books
Mayo Clinic